Ghost of Lion Castle is a 1984 adventure module for the Dungeons & Dragons fantasy roleplaying game.  Its module code is BSOLO, and it was written by Merle M. Rasmussen with cover art by Bob Maurus.

Plot summary
Ghost of Lion Castle is a solo scenario, including solo combat rules, and is intended for a low-level character. The player character investigates a castle shaped like a vast lion.

Ghost of Lion Castle is a Basic D&D adventure that can be played in a few solitary hours, in which the player can be heir to the great wizard Sargon whose ghost haunts Lion Castle.  The player can use one of six provided magic-user or elf characters or one of the player's own player characters, limited to the modified spells listed and to third-level experience.  The player gets maps of the main walls and hallways of Lion Castle, printed on three of the cover's six panels.  With twelve days' rations when the character reaches the outer wall, the character still must be crafty enough to fight through wandering monsters and deadly traps to gain Sargon's blessing.

This adventure is intended for one player only, who makes all of the choices and enjoys all of the rewards. A mighty wizard once lived in Lion Castle, but he is a ghost now, haunting those halls, and waiting for an heir. It is said that he is a great cat that sits upon the northern grasslands, waiting to pounce on adventurers just like the player characters.

Publication history

Ghost of Lion Castle was written by Merle M. Rasmussen, and published by TSR in 1984 as a 32-page booklet with an outer folder.

Reception
C. Mara Mallory reviewed Ghost of Lion Castle in The Space Gamer No. 75. Mallory commented that "The 'R' rules entries are a 'programmed introduction' to the programmed game entries.  The 'magic journal' of notes down the page edges enables you to leave message for future characters, as well as note changes in the contents of a room when you loot it or die there – all to lend greater realism in replays.  While valuable room contents are often for either a magic-user or a fighter (not both), fortunate probing and good rolls with wandering monsters can net some valuable treasures and experience for a developing D&D character." The reviewer continued "Unless you read maps and directions, you may lose your way in the castle entries, confused by four similar tower staircases and entries with as many as twelve alternative action choices.  Well-rendered but sparse interior illustrations do little to clarify entry descriptions.  And while it is possible to fight your way through Lion Castle on your own, magical combat is set up to be virtually unplayable without the Basic D&D rules." Mallory concluded the review by saying "Not as complex and involved as the invisible-ink solo modules, Ghost of Lion Castle offers little for anyone but the Basic D&D gamer trying to gain experience for a low-level character.  The 'magic journal' does enhance replayability, and there is adequate material for a gamemaster to use the module to create a new adventure.  But those who are looking for a challenging solo would do well to look elsewhere."

References

External links
 The B series from The Acaeum
 

Dungeons & Dragons modules
Mystara
Role-playing game supplements introduced in 1984
Works set in castles